Hegumen Mardarije (1543–45) was a Serbian Orthodox monk and one of the first printers of Serbian language books.

Mardarije received his education in the Monastery of the Holy Trinity of Pljevlja. To save its liturgical books and other valuables, he moved to Banja Monastery and became its hegumen. In 1543, he and two monks from Mileševa monastery travelled to Venice to buy the printing press and bring it to Mileševa to establish the Mileševa printing house.

Early life 

He was a Serb from Podrinje, who descended from Vraneši, Sokolac, Sanjak of Bosnia, Ottoman Empire (modern day Republika Srpska, Bosnia and Herzegovina).

Mardarije was educated in the Monastery of the Holy Trinity of Pljevlja. When he learned that the Ottomans were going to destroy Ljuboviđa Church in Pavino Polje, he took liturgical books and other valuables and transported them to Banja Monastery using six loaded horses.

Mileševa printing house 

In 1543, Mardarije was a hegumen of the Banja Monastery near Priboj when Todor Ljubavić, a monk in Mileševa and son of Božidar Ljubavić, was sent to Venice to join his brother, Đurađ, and to buy a printing press for the monastery. Todor was accompanied by the Mileševa monk Sava and by Mardarije. At that time, Banja Monastery was a seat of the metropolitan bishop while Mileševa was the richest monastery of Dabar eparchy. That is why those two monasteries were given the task to finance and organize establishing of the printing house in Mileševa and why Mardarije travelled to Venice together with monks from Mileševa. The Mileševa printing house was operational in period 1544–1557. Three books were printed in it, Psalter (Псалтир, 1544), Breviary (Требник, 1545) and another Psalter (1557). Psalter of 1544 was edited and prepared by Mardarije and Teodor Ljubavić, based on 1519–20 Psalter of Božidar Vuković.

In 1545, Mardarije went to Bogovađa near Lajkovac and rebuilt it. An engraved plate commemorates this rebuilding and mentions Mardarije and Vraneši as his fatherland.

Misidentification with hegumen Mardarije 

In many earlier sources, Hegumen Mardarije, who was hegumen of the Banja Monastery, is misidentified with Hieromonk Mardarije who was also a printer, but in Mrkšina crkva printing house and Belgrade printing house. Taking into consideration that Mardarije of Mrkšina crkva never mentioned in his books his much higher position of the hegumen of Banja Monastery, it was concluded that Hegumen Mardarije and Hieromonk Mardarije were two different people.

See also
Božidar Vuković
Božidar Goraždanin
Đurađ Crnojević
Stefan Marinović
Hieromonk Makarije
Hieromonk Mardarije
Vićenco Vuković
Hieromonk Pahomije
Trojan Gundulić
Andrija Paltašić
Jakov of Kamena Reka
Bartolomeo Ginammi who followed Zagurović's footsteps reprinting Serbian books.
Dimitrije Ljubavić
Inok Sava

References

Sources

Further reading
 

16th-century Serbian people
16th-century printers
16th-century Eastern Orthodox clergy
Serbian printers
Serbian Orthodox clergy
Serbian monks
People from Sokolac
Serbs of Bosnia and Herzegovina
Year of birth unknown
16th-century deaths
Year of death unknown
16th-century Christian monks
16th-century businesspeople from the Ottoman Empire